These are the results of the Women's quadruple sculls competition, one of six events for female competitors in Rowing at the 2004 Summer Olympics in Athens.

Quadruple Sculls women

Heat 1 - August 15, 09:40

: Alison Mowbray, Debbie Flood, Frances Houghton and Rebecca Romero 6:15.60 -> Final A
: Oksana Dorodnova, Anna Sergeyeva, Larisa Merk, Yuliya Levina 6:17.72 -> Repechage
: Mariya Vorona, Volha Berazniova, Tatsyana Narelik, Mariya Brel 6:20.72 -> Repechage
: Olena Morozova, Olena Olefirenko, Yana Dementyeva, Tetiana Kolesnikova 6:21.24 -> Repechage

Heat 2 - August 15, 09:47

: Kathrin Boron, Meike Evers, Manuela Lutze, Kerstin El Qalqili 6:16.49 -> Final A
: Michelle Guerette, Hilary Gehman, Kelly Salchow, Danika Holbrook 6:18.63 -> Repechage
: Dana Faletic, Rebecca Sattin, Amber Bradley, Kerry Hore 6:23.46 -> Repechage
: Dorthe Pedersen, Sarah Lauritzen, Christina Rindom, Majbrit Nielsen 6:28.16 -> Repechage

Repechage - August 18, 11:00

: Oksana Dorodnova, Anna Sergeyeva, Larisa Merk, Yuliya Levina 6:23.13 -> Final A
: Olena Morozova, Olena Olefirenko, Yana Dementyeva, Tetiana Kolesnikova 6:24.64 -> Final A
: Dana Faletic, Rebecca Sattin, Amber Bradley, Kerry Hore 6:24.67 -> Final A
: Michelle Guerette, Hilary Gehman, Kelly Salchow, Danika Holbrook 6:25.39 -> Final A
: Dorthe Pedersen, Sarah Lauritzen, Christina Rindom, Majbrit Nielsen 6:25.41 -> Final B
: Mariya Vorona, Volha Berazniova, Tatsyana Narelik, Mariya Brel 6:29.04 -> Final B

Final A - August 22, 09:30

The Ukrainian crew was disqualified after Olena Olefirenko tested positive for ethamivan.

Final B - August 21, 11:40

References

External links
Official Olympic Report

Women's Quadruple Sculls
Women's Quadruple Sculls
Women's events at the 2004 Summer Olympics